DCDS may refer to:
 Detroit Country Day School, a private school
 DECHEMA Chemistry Data Series, a series of books with thermophysical data published by DECHEMA
Deputy Chief of the Defence Staff